The Herzegovina uprising, also known as Vukalović's Uprising, was an uprising fought by ethnic Serbs in the Herzegovina region against the Ottoman Empire between 1852 and 1862. It was led by chieftain Luka Vukalović.

Background
After the execution of Ali-paša Rizvanbegović, who had made efforts to promote agriculture and recuperate the economy of the Herzegovina Eyalet under his rule, the eyalet was abolished and merged into the Bosnia Eyalet.

In March 1852, Ottoman general Omar Pasha (Omer-paša) decided to disarm the Herzegovinians, which sparked an outrage in the region. The chieftain of the Herzegovinians was Luka Vukalović. The refusal of giving up arms resulted in minor fights between Vlasi from Herzegovina and Turks (local Slavic Muslims), which in turn resulted in an uprising, which Vukalović would lead.

Uprising

The uprising began in winter 1852/53, when the Grahovljani, Banjani and Drobnjaci refused to pay the Turks a debt. As the actions against Montenegro by the Ottomans began, the East Herzegovinian clans fought alongside Montenegrins. Although there weren't major actions in the period of 1853–57, there wasn’t peace. Austria evidently interfered in the actions of Vukalović, as it would help Montenegro, and the French consulates followed the uprising. The uprising was boosted in December 1857, after Knez Danilo started backing the rebels, bitter at the Porte because of its statements in the Paris Congress in 1856.

After the Battle of Grahovac on May 1, 1858, when Montenegrin and Herzegovinian rebels defeated the Turks, Knez Danilo titled Vukalović the voivode of Zubac, Kruševica, Dračevica and Sutorina, giving him some autonomy.

The Porte agreed on appeasement, it carried out a border with Montenegro, thus recognizing the independence of Montenegro. As the great part of East Herzegovina, except Grahovo, part of Banjani, Drobnjaci, Župa and Nikšič Rudina was left under Ottoman rule, Vukalović continued the uprising. This strongly echoed in Bosnia, in particular the revolts in Bosanska Krajina and Posavina in 1858.  Afraid that the uprising would spill over in its territory, Austria increased its tackling of Vukalović, helping in different ways even the Turks.

Vukalović in his requests didn't only deal with economical problems of Herzegovina, but marking the fight for national liberation, seeking for Herzegovina to join Montenegro. This character of uprising sparked the interest of the great powers of Europe, whom consulate representatives worked on giving Vukalović to the Ottoman government. Vukalović continued fighting against the Turks, and after the violent death of Knez Danilo in 1860, inspired by the unification of Italy which was led by Garibaldi.

Since 1861, Omer-paša tried in many ways to end the uprising, unsuccessfully.  But when Montenegro, after a defeat to the Turk in August 1862, promised that it wouldn't help the rebel movement in Herzegovina, Vukalović understood this as the people had been strained and then wrote to Omer-paša, who promised amnesty for all rebels.

Aftermath
Omer-paša promised Vukalović that he would continue his office as voivode of Zubac, Kruševica, Dračevica and Sutorina, but this was not held, he instead appointed him bimbaša of 500 pandurs who would secure peace along the borders. When he saw that the Ottomans didn't give their promises of relief on feudal duties and tax cuts, he tried in 1865 to once again start an uprising, but without any help, was unsuccessful. Vukalović left his birthplace and migrated to Russia, where he died in 1873.

See also
Montenegrin–Ottoman War (1852–53)
Epirus Revolt of 1854

References

Sources

  "The Uprisings in Herzegovina, 1852-1862"

Serb rebellions against the Ottoman Empire
1850s in the Ottoman Empire
1860s in the Ottoman Empire
Ottoman–Serbian Wars
Principality of Serbia
Principality of Montenegro
Rebellions in Bosnia and Herzegovina
19th century in Bosnia and Herzegovina
History of the Serbs of Bosnia and Herzegovina
19th-century rebellions
Rebellions in Montenegro
Wars involving Bosnia and Herzegovina during Ottoman period